Aechmea disjuncta is a species of flowering plant in the genus Aechmea. This species is endemic to the State of Bahia in eastern Brazil.

References

disjuncta
Endemic flora of Brazil
Plants described in 1940